Luis Francisco García Caldera (born June 21, 1987, in Guadalajara, Jalisco) is a Mexican retired footballer who last played for Necaxa.

Club career
"Guicho" García joined Indios de Ciudad Juárez for the Apertura 2009 tournament.

References

External links

1987 births
Living people
Footballers from Guadalajara, Jalisco
Association football defenders
Mexican footballers
Club Necaxa footballers
Indios de Ciudad Juárez footballers